Filip Kubala (born 2 September 1999) is a Czech footballer who plays as a forward for 1. FC Slovácko.

References

External links
Filip Kubala at FAČR

Living people
1999 births
Czech footballers
Association football midfielders
1. FC Slovácko players
FK Viktoria Žižkov players
Czech First League players
Czech National Football League players
MFK Karviná players
Czech Republic youth international footballers
FK Fotbal Třinec players
Sportspeople from Třinec
FC Hradec Králové players